Oxtail (occasionally spelled ox tail or ox-tail) is the culinary name for the tail of cattle. While the word once meant only the tail of an ox, today it can also refer to the tails of other cattle.

Description
Oxtail is a gelatin-rich meat, which is usually slow-cooked as a stew or braised. It is a traditional stock base for oxtail soup. Traditional preparations involve slow cooking, so some modern recipes take a shortcut using a pressure cooker. Oxtail is the main ingredient of the Italian dish coda alla vaccinara (a classic of Roman cuisine). It is a popular flavour for powdered, instant and premade canned soups in the United Kingdom and Ireland. Oxtails are also one of the popular bases for Russian aspic appetizer dishes, along with pig trotters or ears or cow "knees", but are the preferred ingredients among Russian Jews because they can be kosher.

Versions

Versions of oxtail soup are popular traditional dishes in South America, West Africa, China, Spain, Korea and Indonesia. In Chinese cuisine, it is usually made into a soup called 牛尾汤 (niúwěi tāng, "oxtail soup"). In Korean cuisine, a soup made with oxtail is called kkori gomtang (see gomguk). It is a thick soup seasoned with salt and eaten with a bowl of rice. It can be used as a stock for making tteokguk (rice cake soup). Stewed oxtail with butter bean or as a main dish with rice is commonly eaten in Jamaica and other West Indian cultures. Oxtail is also very popular in South Africa, where it is often cooked in a traditional skillet called a potjie, which is a three-legged cast iron pot placed over an open fire. Oxtail is also eaten in other southern parts of Africa like Zimbabwe and served with sadza and greens. 

In Cuban cuisine, a stew can be made from oxtail called rabo encendido. In the Philippines, it is prepared in a peanut-based stew called kare-kare. In Iran, oxtail is slow-cooked and served as a substitute for shank in a main dish called baghla-poli-mahicheh, which is prepared with rice, shank (or oxtail) and a mixture of herbs including dill, coriander, parsley and garlic. In India, it is known as dumghazah in the parts in and around Lucknow, Uttar Pradesh and is considered a delicacy.

United States meat-cutting classification
In the United States, oxtail has the meat-cutting classification NAMP 1791.

References

External links

Cuts of beef
Jamaican cuisine
Trinidad and Tobago cuisine
Soul food
East Asian cuisine
Southeast Asian cuisine